= Calders Peak =

Mountain in West Virginia, United States

Coordinates: 37.5957000°N 80.5770500°W

Calders Peak is a summit in West Virginia, in the United States. With an elevation of 3,219 feet (981 m), Calders Peak is the 274th highest summit in the state of West Virginia.

The summit was named for Alexander Calder, who erected an observation tower here.
